Hirudo sulukii is a species of leech that has been found from Kara Lake of Adiyaman, Sülüklü Lake of Gaziantep and Segirkan wetland of Batman in Turkey.

References

Leeches
Animals described in 2016